Jason Martin (born 14 September 1970) is an Australian former professional rugby league footballer who played in the 1990s.

Background
Born in Tamworth, Martin grew up in Tea Gardens, just north of Newcastle. He attended Raymond Terrace High School, where represented the Australian Schoolboys in 1988, before signing with the North Sydney Bears.

Playing career

North Sydney Bears
In Round 20 of the 1989 NSWRL season, Martin made his first grade debut as an 18-year old in North Sydney's 6–30 loss to the Parramatta Eels. In 1990, he had a breakout year for the Bears, playing 22 games and winning the Dally M Rookie of the Year and finishing second in voting for the Dally M medal.

In 1991, he was an important factor in the Bears' finals run, in which they made it to the preliminary final, and finished third in Rothmans Medal voting.

An accomplished singer and guitarist, Martin released a single in 1991 called "Take Me to the Top", the video of which featured clips of Martin playing for North Sydney, and several of his Bears teammates singing backup vocals.

Newcastle Knights
In 1993, Martin returned to Newcastle, but was unable to cement his spot as the starting halfback, playing just 14 games. In 1994, he played just two games being stuck behind Newcastle's young star halfback Andrew Johns. His last match for the club was a loss to the Cronulla Sharks in the reserve grade Grand Final.

North Queensland Cowboys
In 1995, after two poor seasons at Newcastle, Martin looked to revive his career by signing with the newly established North Queensland Cowboys. Martin was appointed inaugural captain of the club but suffered a groin injury and a hernia, causing him to miss the first 10 weeks of the season. He made eight appearances in his first season at the club, captaining them five times. In 1996, he played 12 games, finishing the season in reserve grade.

Paris Saint-Germain
In 1997, Martin joined Paris Saint-Germain in the Super League, playing 20 games and scoring three tries.

Achievements and accolades

Individual
Dally M Rookie of the Year: 1990

Statistics

NSWRL/ARL

Super League

Discography

Singles

References

External links
 Statistics at rugbyleagueproject.org

1970 births
Living people
Australian rugby league players
North Sydney Bears players
Newcastle Knights players
North Queensland Cowboys players
Paris Saint-Germain Rugby League players
Rugby league players from New South Wales